= Anhui Construction Engineering Group =

Chinese construction company

- Native name: 安徽建工集团
- Industry: Civil engineering
- Headquarters: Anhui, China
- Website: www.aceg.com.cn/english/index.jsp

Anhui Construction Engineering Group (ACEG) is a Chinese construction company that ranks as the 65th largest contractor in the world by 2011 revenue.

As a contractor of international projects through its subsidiary Anhui Construction Engineering Group Overseas Development Co it has found success in places like Bangladesh where it was selected to build the 7th China-Bangladesh Friendship Bridge at Kazirtek, which will ease travel over the Arial Khan river, located between Dhaka and Barisal, and the construction of three other bridges on the Madaripur-Shariatpur-Chandpur road.
